Tillie Walden (born 1996) is an American cartoonist who has published five graphic novels and a webcomic. Walden won the 2018 Eisner Award for Best Reality-Based Work for her graphic novel Spinning, making her one of the youngest Eisner Award winners ever.

Early life
Tillie Walden grew up in New Jersey and Austin, Texas. Walden was shaped by her childhood move from New Jersey to Texas. She was a competitive ice skater.

Walden is named after her paternal grandmother, an artist who died before Walden was born. Walden's first comic was a black-and-white comic "about never knowing her [grandmother] but following in her footsteps." A workshop led by Scott McCloud had been a major turning point in her career, given it "really inspired [her] to draw some comics, and around this time [she] was also becoming increasingly bored with fine art".

Growing up, Walden read a lot of manga. This greatly influenced her work, leading her to focus more on line than shape or color. The biggest manga artist that had an impact on her was Yoshihiro Togashi, creator of the manga Hunter x Hunter. Additionally, in an interview, Walden said "Studio Ghibli has completely shaped my visual vocabulary and how I think about stories." Walden is said to have also been influenced by graphic memoirs, such as Fun Home by Alison Bechdel, Blankets by Craig Thompson and Stitches by David Small.

Walden began putting her comics and drawings on her website, and was discovered while still in high school by British publisher Avery Hill Publishing, who worked with Walden to publish her first graphic novel, The End of Summer.

Career
Walden's debut graphic novel, The End of Summer, was published by Avery Hill in June 2015. It is told from the viewpoint of Lars, a feeble boy who lives in a fantastical palace and has a giant cat named Nemo. In an interview with Paul Gravett, she dedicates the book to her twin brother, John. She describes the main characters as being a mishmash of her and John. Walden won the 2016 Ignatz Award for outstanding artist for The End of Summer.

Her second graphic novel, I Love This Part, was published by Avery Hill in November 2015 and tells the story of two teenage girls who fall in love. Walden won the 2016 Ignatz Award for promising new talent for I Love This Part. The novel was also nominated for the 2016 Eisner Award for Best Single Issue/One-Shot.

Walden's third graphic novel, A City Inside, was published by Avery Hill in 2016. It won the 2016 Broken Frontier Award for Best One-Shot.

Spinning, Walden's first graphic novel memoir about her years coming-of-age as a competitive ice skater, was published by First Second Books in September 2017. Originally, Spinning was Walden's thesis work for the Center for Cartoon Studies (CCS) during her second year of schooling there. It won the 2018 Eisner Award for Best Reality-Based Work, making Walden one of the youngest Eisner Award winners ever at 22.

Walden's On a Sunbeam, a science fiction webcomic, was nominated for the 2017 Eisner Award for Best Digital Comic. The webcomic was adapted into a graphic novel that was released in October 2018 by First Second Books, with the UK edition published by Avery Hill Publishing. Set in space, the story revolves around a crew in charge of rebuilding structures, which allows them to acknowledge the past. As Mia, the newest member, gets to know her team, a flashback occurs where she fell in love with another student named Grace. As time progresses and bonds are formed, Mia inevitably opens up about her reasoning for joining their ship. This piece is Walden's first take on science fiction. The graphic novel won the 2018 Los Angeles Times Book Prize.

To commemorate International Women's Day, Walden's piece "Minutes" was featured as a Google Doodle on March 8, 2018.

In 2019, Walden published Are You Listening? from First Second Books, which earned her the 2020 Eisner Award for Best Graphic Album-New.

In 2021, Walden announced her next graphic novel, Clementine, to be released in June 2022. The comic will follows the continuation of Clementine, a character from The Walking Dead video game series, after the events of the game. The previews have caused controversy among fans of the franchise, particularly for Clementine acting out of character and undoing the ending of Season Four.

In 2022, Walden and Emma Hunsinger published My Parents Won't Stop Talking! from First Second Books.

Personal life
Walden has known she was a lesbian since she was 5. Before she came out, Walden avoided including queer characters in her stories, feeling that she "couldn't draw openly gay characters if [she] was still scared to be openly gay".

Walden spoke of her father's influence on her entrance into the comics industry. As said in an interview, "My dad has been the behind-the-scenes guy for my entire comics career. I realized that when I start looking, he’s been everywhere."

Walden is a graduate of the Center for Cartoon Studies. She also works as a professor there.

Published works 

 The End of Summer (Avery Hill Publishing 2015)
 I Love This Part (Avery Hill Publishing 2015)
 A City Inside (Avery Hill Publishing 2016)
 Spinning (First Second Books 2017)
 On a Sunbeam (First Second Books 2018)
 Are You Listening? (First Second Books 2020)
 My Parents Won't Stop Talking! (First Second Books 2022)
 Clementine

Awards 

 Broken Frontier, 2016 – A City Inside
 Ignatz Award, 2016 –The End of Summer
 Ignatz Award, 2016 Outstanding artist – The End of Summer
 Ignatz Award, 2016 Promising new talent – I Love This Part
 Eisner Award, 2018 Best Reality-Based Work – Spinning
 Los Angeles Times Book Prize, 2018 – On A Sunbeam 
 Eisner Award, 2020 Best Graphic Album-New – Are You Listening?

References

External links
 
 On a Sunbeam (webcomic)

1996 births
21st-century American artists
21st-century American women writers
American female comics artists
American graphic novelists
American webcomic creators
Artists from Austin, Texas
Eisner Award winners
Female comics writers
Ignatz Award winners
Ignatz Award winners for Outstanding Artist
American lesbian writers
LGBT comics creators
LGBT people from New Jersey
LGBT people from Texas
Living people
Center for Cartoon Studies alumni
American lesbian artists